The Limits is a locality in the North Burnett Region, Queensland, Australia.

Geography 
The lower flatter areas (approx ) in the north of the locality and other areas in the various creek valleys are used for grazing cattle.

History 
The origin of the name is unclear but the Von Cronholm family were fruit growers at "The Limit" (singular) from at least 1936.

References 

North Burnett Region
Localities in Queensland